The Puits d'amour is a French pastry with a hollow center. The center is usually stuffed with redcurrant jelly or raspberry jam; a later variation replaced the jam with vanilla pastry cream. The surface of the cake is sprinkled with confectioners' sugar or covered with caramel.

Etymology
Puits d'amour is a French expression carrying erotic connotations; it literally translates to 'well of love'.

History
The first mention of the recipe appeared in Vincent De La Chapelles 1735 recipe book Le cuisinier moderne (the modern cook). La Chapelle presented two recipes for a gâteau de puits d’amour (puits d'amour cake)  consisting of a large puff pastry vol-au-vent topped with a pastry handle and stuffed with redcurrant jelly, the ensemble was meant to resemble the bucket of a well. The other recipe is for the petits puits d’amour (small puits d'amour), a bouchée sized variant of the cake.

In the eighteenth century, the puits d'amour caused scandal because of its name and presentation which alludes to the female genitalia; nevertheless it was very successful in the court of Louis XV's intimate dinners.

Nicolas Stohrer, one of the exiled Polish king Stanislas pâtissiers preferred to stuff the dessert with vanilla pastry cream and glazed the top with a thick layer of caramel, removing the scandalous connotation of the red fruits jam filling.

Preparation
A puits d'amour is made up of layers of staggered rings of puff pastry placed on top of a pastry circle. An egg yolk can be used to help the dough rings to stick together.  The finished pastry "wells" are baked until puffed and golden-brown and set to cool. They are then sprinkled with powdered sugar, raspberry jam or redcurrant jelly which is carefully spooned in the hollow center.

In a later variation, the top is glazed with caramel icing and pastry cream is used as filling.

See also
 List of pastries
 List of stuffed dishes
 Éclair (pastry)

References

French pastries
Stuffed desserts
Custard desserts
Foods with jam